Sax Maniac is a 1982 album by New York jazz-punk band James White and the Blacks. The album was released on Chris Stein's Animal Records label and dedicated to Anya Philips.

Track listing
All tracks composed by James White, except where indicated
 "Disco Jaded"
 "Irresistible Impulse"
 "Money to Burn"
 "Sax Machine"
 "Sax Maniac"
 "That Old Black Magic" (Harold Arlen, Johnny Mercer)
 "The Twitch"

Personnel
Jame White and the Blacks
James White - lead vocals, alto saxophone, piano on "Irresistible Impulse" and "Disco Jaded"
Chris Cunningham, Jerry Antonius - guitar
The Discolitas (Bemshi Jones and Cherie Donovan) - backing and lead vocals
Colin Wade - bass
Ralph Rolle - drums, percussion

Guests
Luther Thomas - saxophone
Robert Aaron - tenor saxophone, piano on "That Old Black Magic"
Joseph Bowie - trombone on "Irresistible Impulse", "Sax Machine" and "Sax Maniac"
John Mulkerin - trumpet on "Irresistible Impulse", "Sax Machine" and "Sax Maniac"
Jack Walrath - trumpet on "That Old Black Magic"
Ray Maldonado - trumpet on "Money to Burn" and "The Twitch"

References

External links

1982 albums
James Chance albums